Signum Regis is a Slovak power metal band, which was founded in 2007 by the bass player and songwriter Ronnie König. Despite often being labelled as a power metal band, their music can also be described as melodic metal with a focus on heavy, shredding guitars. Most of the Signum Regis band members were part of a metal band called Vindex.

History 
In 2007, Ronnie König founded the band Signum Regis and together with the vocalist Göran Edman they started working on a self-titled album, which was released the following year through Locomotive Records.

In 2015, the band participated in the Spark Fresh Blood contest organised by the rock magazine Spark, Budweiser Budvar and Bandzone.cz. After getting into the final 12, the band performed at the III.Finals Concert, which took place on November 14, 2015, in Liberec, Czech Republic. In January 2016, Signum Regis were announced the winners of the contest.

On September 11, 2018, the band informed on their official Facebook page that the lead singer Mayo Petranin was leaving the band.  João "Jota" Fortinho became the new lead singer of Signum Regis in June 2019.

Their latest album "The Seal of a New World" was released on November 22, 2019, and it immediately received excellent reviews from all over the world.

Band members 
Current members
 Jota Fortinho  - vocals
Ronnie König - bass guitar
 Filip Koluš - guitar
 Ján Tupý - keyboards and backing vocals
 Jaro Jančula - drums

Past members
 Mayo Petranin - vocals
Ado Kaláber - guitar
 Luděk Struhař - drums
 Adrian Ciel - drums

Guest Vocals
 Göran Edman 
 Lance King 
 Michael Vescera  
 Matt Smith 
 Daísa Munhoz
 Eli Prinsen
 Samuel Nyman
 Thomas Winkler
David Åkesson

Other
 Libor Krivák - lead guitar (Symphonity) 
 Ivo Hofmann - keyboards (Symphonity)
Magnus Karlsson - guitar

Timeline

Discography 
 Signum Regis (2008)
 The Eyes of Power (2010)
 Exodus (2013)
 Through The Storm (EP) (2015)
 Chapter IV: The Reckoning (2015)
 Decennium Primum (2017)
 Addendum Primum (EP) (2017)
 The Seal of a New World (2019)
 Flag of Hope (2020)

References

External links 

 Official website
 Official Facebook page
 Official Youtube channel
 Announcement about Mayo Petranin leaving the band - September 11, 2018
 The Seal of a New World - New Album Press Release
 Band photo from their press release - September 6, 2019
 Interview in Metalmania Magazin (in Slovak) - November 17, 2019

Slovak heavy metal musical groups
Musical groups established in 2007
Power metal musical groups